Simon H. Jefferies (born 11 July 1955) is a British coxswain. He won a gold medal at the 1980 World Rowing Championships in Hazewinkel with the lightweight men's eight. He was the cox for the British men's eight at the 1988 Summer Olympics where they came fourth. He was part of the British eight at the 1975 World Rowing Championships in Nottingham, the crew finished 9th overall after a third-place finish in the B final.

References

External links
 

1955 births
Living people
British male rowers
World Rowing Championships medalists for Great Britain
Coxswains (rowing)
Olympic rowers of Great Britain
Rowers at the 1988 Summer Olympics